Alimpești is a commune in Gorj County, Romania. It is composed of five villages: Alimpești, Ciupercenii de Olteț, Corșoru, Nistorești and Sârbești.

References

Communes in Gorj County